The Troude class was a group of three protected cruisers built for the French Navy in the late 1880s and early 1890s. The Troude-class cruisers were intended to serve as flotilla leaders for the torpedo boats, and they were armed with a main battery of four  guns.

All three members of the class served in the Mediterranean Squadron in their early careers, where they took part in routine training exercises. In 1897, Troude became the flagship of the Levant Division and was later transferred to the North Atlantic Division in 1899. All three ships were in reserve by 1901. Troude was reactivated for a brief stint in the North Atlantic from 1904 to 1905, while Lalande returned to service in the Mediterranean in 1906. Troude was discarded in 1907 or 1908 and Lalande was broken up for scrap in 1912. Cosmao remained in reserve until the start of World War I in August 1914, when she was recommissioned to patrol the coast of French Morocco. She, too, was scrapped after the war in 1922.

Design

The naval engineer Louis-Émile Bertin had advocated for just such a vessel since 1875, and his design became the cruiser . Bertin's design would eventually be developed into the -type of protected cruisers.

In the early 1880s, the  doctrine, which envisioned using a combination of cruisers and torpedo boats to defend France and attack enemy merchant shipping, became popular in French naval circles. He requested on 1 February 1886 just such a vessel from Marie de Bussy, the Inspector General of Naval Engineering. Over the following month, de Bussy prepared a more detailed design based on these specifications, which Aube approved on 20 March. Three of the vessels were allocated to the 1887 budget, which included a number of other cruisers, all of which were part of Aube's program to equip the French fleet with a number of commerce raiders.

The first two vessels of the 1887 budget— and —were built in government shipyards according to de Bussy's plans, but for the third vessel, he issued the requirements prepared in February to private shipyards for competing designs. By this time, an extraordinary budget was passed for 1887 that included three more small cruisers. As with the Forbin-class ships, the original armament of just two medium-caliber guns was deemed to be insufficient, and so they were modified during construction to receive an additional pair of guns.

General characteristics and machinery

They displaced  as designed. Their hulls had a pronounced ram bow and tumblehome shape that characterized most French warships of the period. They had a minimal superstructure that consisted primarily of a small bridge. Their crew amounted to 200 officers and enlisted men.

The ships' propulsion systems were manufactured by Schneider-Creusot and consisted of a pair of horizontal compound steam engines driving two 3-bladed, bronze screw propellers. Steam was provided by five coal-burning fire-tube boilers that were ducted into two closely placed funnels. The forward funnel was thin and the aft wider, though both were raked backward slightly. The ships vibrated excessively at speeds in excess of 20 knots, however, and the hull and engines were reportedly unable to withstand prolonged steaming at top speed as a result. This was a result of the lightly-built hull and insufficiently strong scantlings, and was common to ships of the type.

Armament and armor
The ships were armed with a main battery of four  M1881/84 30-caliber guns in individual pivot mounts, all in sponsons located amidships with two guns per broadside. For close-range defense against torpedo boats, they carried four  M1885 3-pounder Hotchkiss guns and four  M1885 1-pounder Hotchkiss revolver cannon. They were also armed with four  torpedo tubes in their hull below the waterline, and they had provisions to carry up to 150 naval mines.

The deck was wrought iron that sloped down at the sides to provide a measure of vertical protection. Above the deck, cofferdam was added to control flooding in the event of battle damage. Below the deck and above the engine and boiler rooms was a  anti-splinter deck to protect the machinery from shell fragments. All of the guns were initially fitted with gun shields. During construction, Troude and Cosmao were modified with an armored conning tower with 40 mm sides, though Lalande did not receive this alteration.

Modifications
The ships of the class underwent a series of modifications over their careers. In 1893–1894, Troude and Lalande had their cofferdams replaced by a layer of highly sub-divided watertight compartments that covered the entire width of the deck. A number of other changes were also carried out, including reinforcing the sponsons for the main battery guns, altering the sailing rig, and converting the main battery to quick-firing guns (QF). Cosmao was similarly modified in 1894–1895. Troude and Cosmao received converted M1881/84 pattern guns, while Lalande had new M1884 pattern guns installed. The navy ordered the forward torpedo tubes be removed in November 1895. The ships had their sailing rig reduced in 1902. The armament for all three ships was revised again in the early 1900s, and by 1904 it consisted of the four main battery guns and a standardized anti-torpedo boat armament of nine 47 mm guns. Each ship carried a pair of 37 mm QF guns to be fitted to their boats. The remaining two torpedo tubes were also removed.

In December 1916, Cosmao—the only member of the class still in service by that time—was disarmed temporarily, before being re-armed in March 1917 with a pair of  guns taken from the cruiser  and four  M1877 guns. The following year, one of the 100 mm guns and two of the 90 mm guns were removed to be installed on other vessels.

Construction

Service history

All three members of the class spent their early careers in the Mediterranean Squadron. During this period, the ships were primarily occupied with peacetime training exercises. In 1897, Troude was transferred to the Levant Division, becoming its flagship. She served there during the early stages of the Cretan Revolt of 1897–1898. She was moved again to the North Atlantic Division in 1899. All three ships were reduced to reserve by 1901.

Troude returned to the North Atlantic Division in 1904, and remained there through 1905. Lalande was reactivated in 1906 for service in the Mediterranean Squadron, while Cosmao remained out of service. Troude was struck from the naval register in either 1907, or 1908, and was broken up for scrap that year. Lalande remained in service in the Mediterranean through 1908. Struck from the naval register in 1911, she was sold to ship breakers the following year. Cosmao was recommissioned in August 1914 after the start of World War I and tasked with patrolling the Moroccan coast, though she saw no action. She was struck in 1919, used as a hulk from 1920 to 1927, and was eventually sold to ship breakers in 1928.

Footnotes

Notes

Citations

References

 
 
 
 
 
 
 
 
 
 
 
 
 
 
 
 

 
Cruiser classes
Ships built in France
Ship classes of the French Navy